The First Cabinet of Stauning was the government of Denmark from 23 April 1924, to 14 December 1926. It was the first Social Democrats government on Denmark.

List of ministers
The cabinet consisted of:

References

1924 establishments in Denmark
1926 disestablishments in Denmark
Stauning I